Tatischevo may refer to:
Tatishchevo (inhabited locality), several inhabited localities in Russia
Tatishchevo (airbase), a military airbase in Saratov Oblast, Russia